Aarti is a 1962 Indian Hindi-language film directed by Phani Majumdar and produced by Tarachand Barjatya. The film stars Meena Kumari in the title role of Aarti, with Ashok Kumar, Pradeep Kumar and Shashikala appearing in pivotal roles. It is based on Sanskar Lakshmi, a play written by Prafulla Desai.

Plot 
An unemployed young man named Deepak (Pradeep Kumar) saves Aarti Gupta (Meena Kumari), a hardworking and dedicated doctor, from drowning, and the two eventually fall in love with each other, although her parent have already engaged her to marry Dr. Prakash (Ashok Kumar). Although Aarti's father firmly disapproves of this relationship, Deepak and Aarti marry. She moves in with him and his family, which includes his father (Jagirdar), elder brother, Niranjan (Ramesh Deo), sister-in-law, Jaswanti (Shashikala) and their three children. Prakash (Aarti's former fiancé) happens to be a friend of this family, as also of Aarti's natal family, and he keeps up his visits to both families. This brings a discord in Aarti's marital life, so much so that Deepak asks her to leave, and she returns to her father's house. This is followed by Deepak having a serious accident, when Prakash is the only surgeon who can operate on him. He agrees to operate on him only if Aarti promises to come back to him and forget her husband.

Cast 
Meena Kumari as Dr Aarti Gupta
Ashok Kumar as Dr. Prakash
Pradeep Kumar as Deepak
Shashikala as Jaswanti
Rajendra Nath as Jivan
Keshto Mukherjee as Johnny
Jagirdar as Deepak's dad
Peace Kanwal as Ramola
Mehmood as Kumar
Chandrima Bhaduri as Sarla's mom
Ramesh Deo as Niranjan

Awards 
Aarti received two nominations at the 1963 annual Filmfare Awards, and won one award. Shashikala won her first Filmfare Award. It was the year when Meena Kumari made a record by having all the three nominations for Best Actress to her credit. She eventually won for Sahib Bibi Aur Ghulam. The Bengal Film Journalists' Association acknowledged Aarti as the ninth-best Indian film of the year, and gave it three additional competitive awards.
Nominations are listed below.

 10th Filmfare Awards:

Won

 Best Supporting Actress – Shashikala

Nominated

 Best Actress – Meena Kumari

Other Awards
Won, BFJA Award for Best Actress (Hindi) – Meena Kumari
Won, BFJA Award for Best Supporting Actress (Hindi) – Shashikala
Won, BFJA Award for Best Audiography (Hindi) – R.G. Pushalkar

Music 
The music for this film is composed by Roshan, with lyrics by Majrooh Sultanpuri.

References

External links 

1960s Hindi-language films
1962 films
Films directed by Phani Majumdar
Films scored by Roshan
Indian films based on plays
Rajshri Productions films